Erman Özgür (born April 13, 1977) is a Turkish former footballer and a current pundit. He used to play as attacking midfielder who can also play as a left winger. Özgür played several years for Trabzonspor before moving to various Anatolian clubs. He is known as a technical player who is equally combative.

Honours

Club
Trabzonspor
Turkish Cup: 2002–03

References

External links
 Profile at TFF.org 
 Profile at footballstats.co.uk

1977 births
Living people
Turkish footballers
Turkey B international footballers
Trabzonspor footballers
Kartalspor footballers
Konyaspor footballers
Gaziantepspor footballers
Akçaabat Sebatspor footballers
Ankaraspor footballers
Mersin İdman Yurdu footballers
Adana Demirspor footballers
Süper Lig players
Turkey under-21 international footballers
Association football midfielders